The Nordic Council Literature Prize is awarded for a work of literature written in one of the languages of the Nordic countries, that meets "high literary and artistic standards". Established in 1962, the prize is awarded every year, and is worth 350,000 Danish kroner (2008). Eligible works are typically novels, plays, collections of poetry, short stories or essays, or other works that were published for the first time during the last four years, or in the case of works written in Danish, Norwegian, or Swedish, within the last two years. The prize is one of the most prestigious awards that Nordic authors can win.

The winner is chosen by an adjudication committee appointed by the Nordic Council. The committee consists of ten members, two each from Denmark, Finland, Iceland, Norway and Sweden. The committee members are generally experts in their own country's literature, as well as their neighbouring countries. In addition to the regular members, additional members may be added to the committee if works are nominated from Åland, the Faroe Islands, Greenland or the Sami language area. Apart from the monetary award, the intent of the prize is also to "increase interest in the literature of neighbouring countries as well in Nordic cultural fellowship".

Committee members as of 2019 
As of 2019 the jury consists of the following proper elected members
Sunna Dís Másdóttir, chair (Iceland)
Ane Farsethås, vice chair (Norway)
Amanda Svensson (Sweden)
Elisabeth Friis (Denmark)
Henrika Ringbom (Finland)
Kristiina Lähde (Finland)
Kristján Jóhann Jónsson (Iceland)
Lise Vandborg (Denmark)
Rune Christiansen (Norway)
Sara Abdollahi (Sweden)

Additionally the jury includes deputy members, appointed members and ex officio members.

List of winners 

The following is a complete list of recipients of the Nordic Council Literature Prize:

References

External links 
 Official website

Nordic Council prizes
Danish literary awards
Nordic literary awards
Awards established in 1962